Jenny Hale (born 1959) is an Australian illustrator and author who has published 20 children's picture books, including the Double Delight flap books with hundreds of thousands of copies in print. Her illustration styles range from naïve and cute (for toddlers) to  detailed watercolour realism. Hale often hides characters and little jokes in her pictures for children to find.

Biography
Hale is the fifth of seven children, all of whom showed drawing talent.  From the age of 8, her drawings were published in the Sun-Herald children's lift-out  pages, and she won prizes in competitions as diverse as the Coca-Cola summer beach sand modelling competition, billboard painting, and a Dulux egg painting competition at Easter 1973. After completing Graphic Design at Randwick TAFE, she worked as a freelance illustrator, graphic designer and copywriter.

Works 
Hale works in pastel, watercolour, coloured pencil, and in Photoshop, concentrating on figure illustration. Her illustrations are often brightly coloured.

A voracious reader, Hale wrote fantasy stories from the age of 10.  Her adult writing career was restricted to advertising copy until her 5th picture book, a maze book about a princess's quest. Little Frog (2007) followed. In 2009 Jenny returned to her writing roots with Jatta, a darker fantasy. It explores the torment of a princess werewolf, who cannot control her bloodlust. The story includes black humour and a "multifarious plot that will have the reader engrossed to the very end", according to Reading Time.

Children’s book reviews
Hale has reviewed for the Sydney Morning Herald Spectrum and regularly reviews for the Sun-Herald.

Publications 
Young adult fantasy novel
Jatta (2009)

Board books
Shoes (2008)
Boots (2008)
Slippers (2008)
Little Frog (2007)
Christmas Surprise (2007)

Princess Poppets series
Words (2006)
Numbers (2006)
Alphabet (2006)
Opposites (2006)
All in a Day (2006)
Around the World (2006)
The Nightingale Quest (A puzzle adventure 2004)

Picture flap book Series: Double Delights
Farm (2005)
Zoo (2005)
Nursery Songs (2003)
Bugs (2003)
Rainy Day (sticker activity book)
Nursery Rhymes (sticker activity book)
Animals (2002)
Nursery Rhymes (2002)

See also

References

External links 
 Jenny Hale on Hachette
 

1959 births
Australian children's writers
Australian illustrators
Australian children's book illustrators
Living people
Australian women illustrators